Cranford is an active commuter railroad station in the township of Cranford, Union County, New Jersey. Trains operate between High Bridge and Newark Penn Station (with limited trains continuing to New York Penn Station and Hoboken Terminal) on New Jersey Transit's Raritan Valley Line. The next station east is Roselle Park while west is Garwood. Cranford station contains two side platforms to service three tracks and is accessible for handicapped persons under the Americans with Disabilities Act of 1990. 

Cranford station opened as French House with the opening of the Elizabethtown and Somerville Railroad on January 1, 1839. The first station was built in 1844, replaced itself in 1869, when it attained its current name of Cranford. The 1869 depot came down in 1905, replaced with a new depot in 1906. The Central Railroad of New Jersey (CNJ) replaced the station in 1929 and 1930 when they began a track elevation process in October 1928. In 1967, the construction and opening of the Aldene Plan, resulting in the line using the former Lehigh Valley Railroad alignment into Newark rather than continuing to Communipaw Terminal in Jersey City. This resulted in a shuttle service between East 33rd Street station in Bayonne and Cranford station. This service operated until August 6, 1978. 

NJ Transit considered Cranford station as a stop of the Union go bus expressway, a bus rapid transit service utilizing the former CNJ alignment between Cranford and Elizabeth.

Station layout
The station has two high-level side platforms. Both were built as island platforms, though the northbound outer track has been removed and the southbound outer track is not built for platform access.

Bibliography

References

External links

world.nycsubway.org - NJT Raritan Line
Photo and brief narrated history of earlier Cranford station by Cranford resident Bernie Wagenblast
 Union Avenue / Walnut Avenue entrance from Google Maps Street View
 Station from Google Maps Street View

NJ Transit Rail Operations stations
Railway stations in Union County, New Jersey
Former Central Railroad of New Jersey stations
Railway stations in the United States opened in 1839
Cranford, New Jersey
1839 establishments in New Jersey